Clay Township is the name of seventeen townships in the U.S. state of Indiana:

 Clay Township, Bartholomew County, Indiana
 Clay Township, Carroll County, Indiana
 Clay Township, Cass County, Indiana
 Clay Township, Dearborn County, Indiana
 Clay Township, Decatur County, Indiana
 Clay Township, Hamilton County, Indiana
 Clay Township, Hendricks County, Indiana
 Clay Township, Howard County, Indiana
 Clay Township, Kosciusko County, Indiana
 Clay Township, LaGrange County, Indiana
 Clay Township, Miami County, Indiana
 Clay Township, Morgan County, Indiana
 Clay Township, Owen County, Indiana
 Clay Township, Pike County, Indiana
 Clay Township, St. Joseph County, Indiana
 Clay Township, Spencer County, Indiana
 Clay Township, Wayne County, Indiana

See also: other places named Clay Township (disambiguation).

Indiana township disambiguation pages